Aleksey Gennadyevich Abramov (born 15 January 1988) is a former Russian footballer.

Playing career

* - played games and goals

External links
 
 

1988 births
People from Severodvinsk
Living people
Russian footballers
Association football midfielders
FC Shinnik Yaroslavl players
Dinaburg FC players
FC Chernomorets Novorossiysk players
FC Zenit-Izhevsk players
Latvian Higher League players
Russian expatriate footballers
Expatriate footballers in Latvia
Russian expatriate sportspeople in Latvia
Sportspeople from Arkhangelsk Oblast